Mace Francis (born 1978) is an Australian composer, band director, and academic.

Career 
Francis moved to Perth, Western Australia from Victoria in 2000 to study jazz composition and arranging. He graduated from WA Academy of Performing Arts in 2004 and completed a PhD at Edith Cowan University in 2015.

In 2003 he was nominated for the Australian Jazz Bell Awards' Best Australian Jazz Song of the Year for Land Speed Record off his album of the same name The album was recorded with a nonet in New York and included American saxophonist Jon Gordon. It was released on Listen/Hear Collective, a record label run by Francis and Johannes Luebbers in Perth.

In 2005 Francis formed the Mace Francis Orchestra and they released seven albums over the next 15 years. Their album Music for Average Photography was nominated for two awards, making the 2016 Australian Jazz Bell Awards shortlist for Best Australian Jazz Ensemble, and winning 2015's Art Music Awards for Jazz Work of the Year.

Since 2008 Francis has been Artistic Director of the West Australian Youth Jazz Orchestra, and Musical Director for their Wednesday Night Orchestra. He has also held the position of Festival Director at the Perth International Jazz Festival since 2017 after the festivals founder and previous Festival Director Graham Wood died.

For his 2021 album Isolation Emancipation, Francis recorded himself playing the trombone for the first time, after he began learning the instrument in 2015. The album was released with a new band Mace Francis Plus 11.

Awards

Academic papers 
From traffic rises: Site specificity and the compositional process (2016)

Music in Site: Integrating elements of site-specificity into composition (2015)

Site in Sound: A Review of Four Musical Works that Integrate Site Into Sound (2012) with Cat Hope

Bob Brookmeyer: composer, performer, pedagogue (2006)

References

External links 

 
 Mace Francis on Edith Cowan University Research Online

Living people
Australian composers
1978 births
Western Australian Academy of Performing Arts alumni
Edith Cowan University alumni
Musicians from Geelong